John Welcome (before 1523 – 1580), of the High Street, Lincoln, was an English politician.

He was a Member (MP) of the Parliament of England for Lincoln in 1572.

References

1580 deaths
People from Lincoln, England
English MPs 1572–1583
Year of birth uncertain